Tajikistan Football League Organization (Tajiki: Лигаи футболи Тоҷикистон) — is a Tajikistani public sports football organization, founded in 2012. Is the main governing body of all divisions of the Tajikistan Football League, also Tajikistan Cup and Tajikistan Super Cup.

In Tajikistan, there is another football organization — the Tajikistan Football Federation, which controls the whole football in the country, manages various national teams (national, olympic, youth and women's teams), as well as holds the TFF Cup.

References

External links 
 Tajikistan Football League Organization official website
  Tajikistan Football Federation official website

Sports organizations of Tajikistan
Football in Tajikistan